In many works of modern fantasy, elves are depicted as a race or species of pointy-eared humanoid beings. These depictions arise from the álfar of Norse mythology influencing elves in fantasy as being semi-divine and of human stature, whose key traits are being friendly with nature and animals (Oftentimes being able to communicate with some facet of nature). However, this differs from Norse and the traditional elves found in Middle Ages folklore and Victorian era literature.

Post-Tolkien fantasy elves tend to be immortal or long-lived in comparison to humans, more beautiful and wiser, with sharper senses and perceptions, and abilities or crafts that seem alien or magical. Often elves do not possess facial or body hair, are not portrayed as fat or old, and are consequently perceived to be androgynous. As a race, Elves are typically depicted as more ancient than humans or other races, mentioned to have flourished in a sort of Golden Age forgotten by other races. That age was often long before other races appeared or were created. Consequently, Elves are often a living relic of a setting's respective fictional mythology and source of its lore.

Characteristics and common features
Modern fantasy literature has revived the elves as a race of semi-divine beings of human stature who are friendly with nature and animals. Although the álfar of Norse mythology has influenced the concept of elves in fantasy, the elves are different from Norse and the traditional elves found in Middle Ages folklore and Victorian era literature.

A hallmark of fantasy elves is also their long and pointed ears (a convention began with a note of Tolkien's that the ears of elves were "leaf-shaped"). The length and shape of these ears vary depending on the artist or medium in question. Post-Tolkien fantasy elves (popularized by the Dungeons & Dragons role-playing game) tend to be immortal or longeval in comparison to humans, more beautiful and wiser, with sharper senses and perceptions, and abilities or crafts that seem alien or magical. Often elves do not possess facial or body hair, are not portrayed fat or old and are consequently perceived to be androgynous.

As a race, Elves are more ancient than humans or other races, mentioned to have flourished in a sort of Golden Age which has been forgotten by other races. That age was often long before other races appeared or were created. Consequently, Elves are often a living relic of a setting's respective fictional mythology and source of its lore.

Half-elves and divergent races of elves, such as high elves and dark elves, were also popularized at this time; in particular, the evil drow of Dungeons & Dragons have inspired the dark elves of many other works of fantasy.

Elves in modern fantasy literature
Early pioneers of the genre such as Lord Dunsany in The King of Elfland's Daughter and Poul Anderson in The Broken Sword featured Norse-style elves. However, the elves found in the works of the 20th-century philologist and fantasy writer J. R. R. Tolkien have formed the view of elves in modern fantasy like no other singular source.

The first appearance of modern fantasy elves occurred in The King of Elfland's Daughter, a 1924 novel by Lord Dunsany. The next modern work featuring elves was The Hobbit, a 1937 novel by J. R. R. Tolkien. Elves played a major role in many of Tolkien's later works, notably The Lord of the Rings. Tolkien's elves were followed by grim Norse-style elves of human size in Poul Anderson's 1954 fantasy novel The Broken Sword.

Tolkien's The Lord of the Rings (1954–1955) became extremely popular and was extensively imitated. In the 1960s and afterwards, elves similar to those in Tolkien's novels became staple, non-human characters, in high fantasy works and in fantasy role-playing games. Tolkien's Elves were enemies of goblins and had a long-standing quarrel with the dwarves; these motifs would re-appear in derivative works.

Tolkien

Though Tolkien originally conceived his Elves as more fairy-like than they afterwards became, he based them on the god-like and human-sized Ljósálfar of Norse mythology. His elves were conceived as a race of beings similar in appearance to humans but fairer and wiser, with greater spiritual powers, keener senses, and a closer empathy with nature. They are great smiths and fierce warriors on the side of good.

Tolkien's Elves of Middle-earth are biologically immortal in the sense that they are not vulnerable to disease or the effects of old age (closer to the concept of indefinite lifespan than true immortality). Although they can be killed in battle like humans and may alternately wither away from grief, their spirits only pass to the blessed land in the west called Valinor, whereas humans' souls leave the world entirely.

Tolkien is responsible for reviving the older and less-used terms elven and elvish rather than Edmund Spenser's invented elfin and elfish (when editors corrected the term to the latter, Tolkien himself was quick to write a correction into the next printing). He probably preferred the word elf over fairy because elf is of Anglo-Saxon origin while fairy entered English from French. He certainly felt the need to differentiate elves, as only one kind of the creatures of faërie, from other inhabitants of that land, and lamented the confusion in English between fairy (faërie) and fairy (fay or elf). Tolkien aso wished to distinguish his elves from the diminutive airy-winged fairies popularized by Michael Drayton's Nymphidia.

Like nearly all others in Middle-earth, Tolkien's elves rarely display any kind of "active" magic as found in later fantasy works, but are nonetheless deemed "magic" by the lesser races, due to their vast number of superhuman abilities (keen senses such as sharper hearing and sight, even to the point of night vision, resting the mind and travel simultaneously, foresight, some kind of telepathy, power to control nature to some extent, such as summoning floods, and the power to conjure visions of the past).

Items made by the elves also seem to have enhanced properties, such as the Silmarils, the Palantiri, the "Lamps of Noldor" and eventually the Rings of Power.

Other artifacts appearing in The Lord of the Rings are the appealing lembas bread capable of keeping a "traveller on his feet for a day of long labour", the reinvigorating beverage miruvor, the unusual hithlain rope, which is strong, tough, light, long, soft to the hand, packs close and, even seems to unknot itself to one's command. The elven-cloaks the Fellowship receive from the elves were thought to be "magic cloaks" by Pippin, and although the elves neither confirmed nor denied this; those cloaks function similarly to the cloak of invisibility often used in works of fiction. King Thranduil of the Mirkwood Elves used "magic doors" to guard his palace, making it almost impossible for anyone to enter or exit against his will. Certain gifts Galadriel gave to the Fellowship of the Ring, such as Frodo's phial and Sam's box of earth from the gardens of Galadriel, also seem to possess magical properties. This elven "magic" is different from the power of Sauron, as Galadriel stated to Frodo and Sam. Dead elves are normally re-embodied after an indefinite period of time – according to Tolkien's Letters and other posthumously published writings.

In the posthumously published The Silmarillion, elves are mentioned as the "firstborn", the first children of Ilúvatar, the god of Tolkien's legendarium. The elves are sorted into two main kindreds: the Eldar and the Avari. The Eldar were divided into three groups: the Vanyar, the Noldor and the Teleri. In Tolkien's writings, the Noldor, the Sindar and the Silvan Elves, the last two being subdivisions of the Teleri, are the most prominent. The elves were summoned by the Valar to live with them in Valinor, long before the appearance of men and flourished in stature, craft and lore.

In "Laws and Customs among the Eldar", published in The History of Middle-earth, Tolkien elaborates on elvish sexuality, reproduction, and sexual norms. The Eldar view the sexual act as extremely special and intimate, for it leads to the conception and birth of children. Extramarital and premarital sex would be considered contradictions in terms, and fidelity between spouses is absolute. Despite their longevity, the Eldar have generally few children with relatively sizable intervals between each child (their numbers are stated to be in steady decline by the Third Age). Their libido eventually wanes and they focus their interests elsewhere, like the arts. Nonetheless, they take great delight in the "union of love", and they consider the period of bearing and raising children as the happiest stage of their lives.

Other authors

Philip Mazza's The Harrow takes a different approach, in a post-apocalyptic fantasy world. Elves are of the En' Edan in the old tongue, or of the races of man and similar origins, those of the good and righteous. In Mazza's first book The Harrow: From Under a Tree, the first appearance of elves is described as follows: "Dressed in pure white and with long black hair was a fair-skinned elf, the Elf-King to be exact, and his name was Dalgaes. Faithfully by the Elf-King’s side was the archer Tinnfierl, a slim elf with auburn hair, wearing a mixture of tan leather and green cloth, and with bow and arrow strapped to his back." For Mazza, there are many of the En' Edan, to include the elves or En' Edhel, the race of dwarfs or the En' Naug, and those of man who reside in the northern wastelands of the Crag or the Mur' Edan.

Guy Gavriel Kay's Fionavar Tapestry series includes both lios alfar (light elves) and swart alfar (dark elves), using variations on the original Norse or Icelandic terms. They play parts corresponding, respectively, to Tolkien's elves and to his goblins (different from orcs).

In Luc Besson's animated trilogy Arthur and the Minimoys and the book series on which they're based, there is a race of elves with African descent called the Minimoys (in the American version, "Invisibles"), who are extremely tiny, 2 mm tall, and it is difficult to see them with the naked eye. They have the usual pointy ears and big eyes, and can be thousands of years old. A thousand Minimoy years is equivalent to ten human years. Their world is a mix of modern and medieval era. It is possible for humans to turn into Minimoys through a special ritual.

Dungeons & Dragons 

Elves are a humanoid race in the Dungeons & Dragons fantasy role-playing game, one of the primary races available for player characters, and play a central role in the narratives of many setting worlds of the game. Elves are renowned for their grace and mastery of magic and weapons such as the bow and sword. Becoming physically mature by the age of 25 and emotionally mature at around 125, they are also long-lived, capable of living more than half a millennium and remaining physically youthful. Possessed of innate beauty and grace, they are viewed as both wondrous and haughty by other races; however, their natural detachment is seen by some as introversion or xenophobia. They were usually antagonistic towards dwarves.

There are numerous different subraces and subcultures of elves, including aquatic elves, dark elves (drow), deep elves (rockseer), grey elves, high elves, moon elves, snow elves, sun elves, valley elves, wild elves (grugach), wood elves and winged elves (avariel).  The offspring of humans and elves are known as "half-elves" among humans, and as "half-humans" among elves.

GURPS 

The Generic Universal RolePlaying System (GURPS) Fourth Edition deals with a wide variety of types of Elves. Discworld Roleplaying Game (which uses the GURPS system) describes the Elves of the Discworld series in addition to the Typical Elf, Royal Elf, and Elf-Kin. GURPS Basic Set: Characters, GURPS Banestorm, GURPS Fantasy, and Dungeon Fantasy Adventurers, part of the Dungeon Fantasy Roleplaying Game (which uses GURPS rules), each have a different template for the "standard" Elf. Other variations in those books and in GURPS Dungeon Fantasy 3: The Next Level include the Dark Elf, Half-Elf (two versions), High Elf, Mountain Elf, Sea Elf (two versions), Shadow Elf, Winged Elf, and Wood Elf. Third Edition supplements with different variations, including the Deep Elf, include GURPS Fantasy (for Third Edition) and GURPS Fantasy Folk.

Warhammer franchise 

In the Warhammer franchise, the first civilized people of the world were the High Elves (Asur) from the Atlantis-like (though unsunken) island realm of Ulthuan. Early on, the High Elves colonized large parts of the Warhammer world, but following the rise of the Druchii (called "Dark Elves" by others than themselves), a fascistoid movement of corsairs and slavers, the High Elves were plunged into civil war and their power greatly faded. Their civil war was followed decades later by a costly war with the Dwarfs, which saw the Elves expelled from many of their colonies, reducing their civilisation to only Ulthuan. Many of the elves who were expelled from their former colonies took up residence in the deep forests of the Old World, and with time became known as Wood Elves (Asrai). The three kindreds of elves in Warhammer are not separate species but rather separate national groups which epitomise the moral and emotional extremes of the powerful elven psyche – The High Elves are elves at their most noble, morally upright and fair, the Dark elves are elves at their most cruel, vicious and debased. The Wood Elves combine aspects of both in their behaviour, seeming fickle, capricious and dangerously inconstant to outsiders. Unlike Tolkien's elves, those of the Warhammer world are not known to interbreed with humans – a consistent feature of their design in recent years being a concern to differentiate them as much as possible from humans, who they might otherwise begin to resemble too closely. Further, while they may bear physical similarity to the works of Tolkien, GW writers have stated that their elves were based on the works of the American science fiction author Poul Anderson.

Warhammer is unique in the aspect that Warhammer 40,000, the science fantasy version of the game, features space faring elves under the name of Eldar (a term borrowed from Tolkien) – an ancient race that once served the Old Ones and in the aftermath of a great catastrophe have split into four distinct groups, the Craftworld Eldar, the rustic Eldar Exodites (dinosaur riding eldar in self-imposed exile) the mysterious and acrobatic Harlequins and the fallen kindred, the Dark Eldar.

Warcraft franchise 

Azeroth, a high fantasy world of the Warcraft franchise created by Blizzard Entertainment, originally featured elves similar to the Warhammer High or Wood Elves. The series introduced the naturalistic violet-skinned Night Elves in Warcraft III, a real-time strategy game, who were portrayed more favorably than traditional dark-skinned elves. These elves, who are among the oldest known races in Azeroth, descended from a tribe of the now extinct Dark Trolls – other races of elves descend from the Night Elves. Despite starting off as magic practitioners, they eventually abandon the use of arcane magic and focus on the powers afforded to them over nature. The High Elves, the outcast of the Night Elves, face the destruction of their kingdom, Quel'Thalas, and its capital, Silvermoon, at the hands of the Scourge. The survivors are thereafter known as Blood Elves and, due to the destruction of the magically-powerful Sunwell, become aware of their magical addiction. This faction was at one point part of the alliance alongside the humans, but abandoned the alliance following the events of Warcraft III. Two new factions of elves were introduced during the events of World of Warcraft: Legion – Nightborne and Void Elves. The Nightborne are subspecies of Night Elf with an affinity for arcane magic, while the Void Elves are Blood Elves who have embraced the power of the Void. Night, Blood and Void Elves, as well as Nightborne, are playable races in the World of Warcraft MMORPG.

Several elf characters from the Warcraft universe are represented in the crossover multiplayer online battle arena game Heroes of the Storm. Tyrande, Sylvanas and Illidan are examples of playable elf heroes in the game. Numerous cards with the card art depicting Night Elves and Blood Elves are present in digital collectible card game Hearthstone.

The Elder Scrolls universe 

The universe of The Elder Scrolls computer games features distinct races of elves (or Mer as they refer to themselves, while humans are conversely referred to as Men) including High Elves (Altmer), Dark Elves (Dunmer, formerly the Chimer or Velothi) and their offshoot the Cantemiric Velothi, Wood Elves (Bosmer), Wild Elves (Ayleid), Snow Elves (Falmer), Sea Elves (Maormer), and the ancestors of all elves, the Aldmer. Within The Elder Scrolls universe, both the "Dwarves" (Dwemer, who are not actually of short stature) and the Orcs (Orsimer) are elven-derived races. One of the human races in The Elder Scrolls universe, the Bretons, also has some elven ancestry, through interbreeding, and this is said for account for their facility for the magical arts.

Heroes of Might and Magic series 
In the Heroes of Might and Magic series, Elves are divided into two sub-species: Wood Elves, and Snow Elves. Wood Elves are from the wooded kingdom of AvLee which lies in eastern Antagarich. They are descendants and cousins of the Vori elves. Snow Elves a.k.a. Vori Elves or "true elves", are from the icy isle of Vori, which lies north of the continent of Antagarich in Heroes of Might and Magic 3 and its expansions.

RuneScape

RuneScape features elves as a race in the game's fictional world of Gielinor. They dwell to the west in the land of Tirannwn. Elves once inhabited much of the Kingdom of Kandarin under Queen Glarial and King Baxtorian, but following the death of Glarial and the disappearance of Baxtorian, retreated west over the mountains, and their continued presence in the world has passed out of the common knowledge of most other races. Some elves mistrust humans, dwarves, gnomes and trolls, and humans may not enter their capital city of Prifddinas. The elves follow the goddess Seren, who led them to Gielinor through the 'World Gate' during the First Age. One elf dwells within the Champions' Guild as the elven champion, while a number of elves serve in the Army Recruitment and Mobilisation Society as formidable wielders of magic. The 'dark elves' of the Iorwerth clan have taken over the elven capital of Prifddinas and turned against the elves to serve a "Dark Lord". Members of the Iorwerth clan are also present in and under the supposedly plague-stricken human city of West Ardougne, disguised as plague doctors. There are also some remaining elves of the other clans, who are now forced to hide as they fight to take back power, and now reside within the hidden lodge of Lletya, as well as within other small camps and areas across Tirannwn.

References

Fantasy tropes
Elves in popular culture
Fantasy creatures